The Dortmund Christmas Market (in German: Dortmunder Weihnachtsmarkt ) is an annual outdoor Christmas market held every year in central Dortmund, Northrhine-Westphalia, Germany. With more than three and a half million visitors of 300 stalls it is one of the biggest Christmas markets of the world and brings tourists from all over the world to Dortmund. It is estimated that the city benefits of a 100 million Euros profit from this 38-day-long tradition.

The Christmas tree of Dortmund Weihnachtsmark is the largest natural Christmas tree in the world.

History
The market's origins date back to 1878. There were no markets between 1939 and 1948. In recent years, Dortmund Weihnachtsmarkt has become the largest Christmas market in Germany, hosting well over 3.5 million visitors annually.

The Christmas market opens in late November and continues until just before New Year's Eve (normally 30 December). It occupies a large area in central Dortmund, including Alter Markt around the St. Reinold's Church, Hansaplatz, Kleppingstraße, and Westenhellweg.

Vendors and attractions

Today the most famous features of Dortmund Weihnachtsmark are the world's largest Christmas tree with more than 45 meters. The tree is made of 1,700 spruces from Sauerland. Twenty huge candles and 48,000 lights shine over the Christmas market. The top is decorated with a four-meter-high angel. The total weight of this structure at a height of 45 metres is 40 tons.  Foundation laying with glühwein and bratwurst will take place on 23 October at 4 p.m. at Hansaplatz. Workers needed four weeks to assemble the red spruces.

 Christmas Village
Situated on the Dortmund Weihnachtsmarkt is a children's adventure world called 'Weihnachtsdorf' (in English: 'Christmas Village'). In the Christmas Village children can read poems aloud, sing songs, do crafts and bake. Furthermore, there is the puppet theatre, merry-go-round and a huge Santa chair with a Fairy tale show.

 Candle pyramids (Christmas pyramid)
In many parts of Germany, the candle pyramid (lightstock) is brought out every year to light up the room at Christmas. Two to five round wooden tiers, gradually smaller towards the top,  are built onto a central rod which rotates, driven by the heat of candles rising up into a rotor at the top. On each tier there are figures connected with Christmas. The whole ornament is usually about 50 cm high, but one of the tallest pyramid in the world takes pride of place at the Dortmund Weihnachtsmarkt, towering a full 12m in the air. Originally, the pyramid was a much simpler affair, simply a frame to hang sprigs of fir upon; the modern-day pyramid did not evolve until the early 19th century.

 Alter Markt Stage

The “Alter Markt” stage presents a lively varied series and show programme every day. On 8 December, the popular WDR 4 'Christmas' show will feature international stars on its stage.

Food and drinks

 Glühwein (mulled wine)

One tradition in Dortmund is drinking steaming mugs of mulled wine at the Weihnachtsmarkt on a cold December night. The hot red wine spiced with cloves and cinnamon is served in specially decorated mugs. The mug features a different design every year and has become a collector's item.

 Glühbier (mulled beer)

Dortmund had more than 550 years of brewing tradition, some of the oldest breweries in Westphalia are founded around the Old Market in Dortmund. A new chapter of the breweries are mulled beer. Mulled beer is a hot beer with honey, brown sugar and winter spices – such as star anise, cinnamon and cardamom.

 Reibekuchen (potato fritters)

Reibekuchen may be served with apple sauce, pumpernickel bread, treacle, or with Maggi-brand seasoning sauce. They are often sold at street fairs and markets, such as Christmas markets in Germany.

 Dortmunder Salzkuchen (Saltcake)

A Dortmund tradition meal is bread buns with caraway fruits, salt, meat and onions.

Medieval Christmas Market Fredenbaum
Throughout Dortmund opened three Christmas markets, each of which is surrounded by souvenir stalls, a carousel and a Nativity scene installed and its local tree. Europe's largest Medieval Christmas Market can be found at Fredenbaumpark in the north of Downtown which takes place from 23 November every weekend.  Here, there is a rustic atmosphere, live music, culinary delights and gift ideas, as well as a Christmas atmosphere in the torchlight.

See also

 List of Christmas markets

References

Christmas markets in Germany
Culture in Dortmund
Economy of North Rhine-Westphalia